D Company is a 2013 Indian Malayalam portmanteau action-thriller gangster drama film. It is an anthology of three independently shot action films directed by M. Padmakumar, Diphan, and Vinod Vijayan. Its cast includes Jayasurya, Anoop Menon, Unni Mukundan, Fahad Fazil and Asif Ali. The film is produced by Vinod Vijayan, Seven Arts Mohan and Faisal Latheef under the banner of D Cutz Film Company and distributed by Seven Arts International.

The film was earlier supposed to have five featurettes of directors Diphan, M Padmakumar, Vinod Vijayan, Shaji Kailas and Joshiy Vasu but was split into two films with the first part having the former three directors' ventures. The second part however did not materialise. D Company released on the festival of Onam 2013.

Plots

Oru Bolivian Diary 1995
Oru Bolivian Diary 1995, set in a tribal habitat deep down the jungle, is about a North Indian Maoist leader Chaukidar (Samuthirakani) who comes to Wayanad to spread his doctrines among the local tribes. They assassinate policemen, and a tribal youth Chinnan (Asif Ali) tries to protect Chaukidar from police. Though Chinnan is apprehended, interrogated and eliminated, Chaukidar remains at bay, continuing to spread his influence. It is shown that Chaukidar is inspired by the book The Bolivian Diary of Ernesto Che Guevara written by Che Guevara. These events are narrated by police inspector Narain, to reporter Indumathi (Ananya) 15 years after the incident. It is finally revealed that Indumathi is also a supporter of Maoism, inspired by the same book which influenced Chaukidar.

Gangs of Vadakkumnathan
Gangs of Vadakkumnathan is a gangster film tells about black money and gang wars of Thrissur town. A murder of a tycoon happens in Bangalore and 7.50 billion are lost, and Inspector Akbar (Anoop Menon) arrives at Thrissur, at the behest of the tycoon's son for investigating the murder case, with a promise of a share in the recovered money. Akbar's team suspect the deadly Gangs of Vadakkumnathan and a jeweller to be involved. Akbar finds the money and eliminates the gangs and the jeweller tactfully, and returns with only part of the money, the rest of which his team keeps. It is finally revealed that unbeknownst to anyone, Akbar was the one who murdered the tycoon and planned the entire setup.

The Day of Judgement
The Day of Judgement is about the agony suffered by a doctor – Sunil Mathew (Fahadh Faasil) after his wife's death.

Dr.Sunil's mentally unstable wife Jeena (Bhama) has fallen from the balcony to her death. Police suspect Sunil, but they inform him that "another" dead body has been found from his villa, and they bring him in early morning for questioning about that "dead body". But no questioning happens all day at the station, and instead police keep telling him that the body was that of one of his nurses, Maya, and all evidence of the murder points to him, including his friend Vishnu's testimony. Sunil escapes from the police station and decides to confront Vishnu to prove his innocence. On the way, he realizes that no murder really occurred; police have laid a trap for him along with Vishnu to make him confess to Jeena's murder 
(which Sunil has in fact committed by actually pushing her down from the balcony as he could not tolerate her mental illness), and they are probably waiting for him at Vishnu's house to try to record him admitting his guilt as evidence and trap him. Sunil instead goes to the bus stand and escapes.

Cast
Oru Bolivian Diary 1995
 Asif Ali as Chinnan
 Samuthirakani as Chaukidaar
 Ananya as Indumathi
 Aadukalam Naren as Nripan Chakraborthy
 Gayathri as Indumathi's mother

Gangs of Vadakkumnathan
 Jayasurya as Varaal Jaison
 Anoop Menon as Akbar
 Unni Mukundan as Sharath
 Joju George as Abhilash Pillai
 Rajeev Pillai as Sudheer Mallya
 Irshad as Narendran
 Parvathy as Lora
 Deepak Parambol as Kuppi Simon
 Arun as Media Person

The Day of Judgement
 Fahadh Faasil as Dr. Sunil Mathew
 Bhama as Jeena
 Tanushree Ghosh as Sarena Mohammed
 Jinu Joseph as Vishnu
 Pooja as Teena

Special Appearances

 Donal Bisht as herself
 Shanvi Srivastava as herself

Production

Pre-production
D Company is touted as Indian cinema's first action anthology. Scenarists Ranjith and A. K. Sajan were also approached for writing two of the films but they rejected. Anoop Menon, who scripted Gangs of Vadakkumnathan, was also initially reluctant to do the project. In an interview, he said, "I have been approached to write a part of D Company. But, right now, my hands are full and I haven't got time to sit and think about it." Parvathy Nair was chosen to play the wife of the character played by Jayasurya. She had earlier been in news for rejecting an important role in the Jayasurya-starrer film Beautiful.

Shaji Kailas's featurette Godse is based on the assassination of Mahatma Gandhi. The director says, "The movie is about the conflict of emotions and explores the turmoil that Godse goes through the night before he kills Mahatma Gandhi. It's basically the fight between the good and the evil. There is an intense struggle that Godse goes through before committing the crime. Finally, he does it, justifying it as God's wish." The film has only a few characters and will be made as a soliloquy of Nathuram Godse, as he weighs the pros and cons of his deed. The film is inspired by the controversial book Freedom at Midnight by Larry Collins and Dominique Lapierre. According to the director, the film evolved from the final pages of the book, which describes what Godse went through before assassinating Gandhi. Godse will start filming as soon as Kailas finishes his project Madirasi.

Veteran director Joshiy, who directed the film starring Mohanlal, first approached Kerala-borne Tamil actress Trisha to play the female lead. However, she opted out citing her busy schedules. However, some reports say that she demanded  40 lakhs, a large sum for a Malayalam film, and the director himself replaced her.

Initially, each segments were planned to be named after colours such as Red, Blue, Green etc. but however this idea was later dropped.

The stunt sequences are done by Mafia Sasi, Thyagarajan, Anal Arash and Kanal Kannan.

Filming
Oru Bolivian Diary 1995, the first short in the series, started its filming in May 2012 in Hyderabad. Its second schedule of filming started on 7 June and the film was shot extensively in Muthanga near Sultan Battery. Major parts were shot in about 10 days. Several locals from Wayanad district and about 20 police officers from the state police force were also part of the film. About the film, M. Padmakumar says, "It's an action film in the sense that an element of suspense is retained throughout and the film is essentially a thriller. It doesn't mean that the film is full of firearm fights and stunt sequences."

Gangs of Vadakkumnathan is the second film in the series. The segment began filming on 20 August 2012 and was shot from Thrissur, Bangalore and Mangalore.

The third segment was titled Diya. Fahadh Faasil plays a doctor in the film. The shoot for Diya will start on 20 May. In June 2013, Bhama stated that she starred in the segment directed by Vinod Vijayan, where she is paired with Fahadh Faasil. Tanushree Ghosh said that she will portray the role of a trainee Assistant Commissioner of Police in Vinod Vijayan's featurette. Praveen B Menon was the production controller of this film.

References

External links

2013 films
Indian anthology films
2013 action films
Indian action films
Indian gangster films
Films about Naxalism
Films shot in Thrissur
Films shot in Bangalore
Films shot in Mangalore
2010s Malayalam-language films
Films directed by M. Padmakumar
Films directed by Diphan